Lyublino Park (Russian: Люблинский парк) is a park in Lyublino and Tesktilshchiki districts of Moscow , a part of a recreational complex "Kuzminki-Lyublino". It is located around Lyublino pond on Churiliha river. The park consists of two parts, divided by Krasnodonskaya street.

The park was created in the beginning of 19th century as an English garden of N.A.Durasov's estate.

Transport 
Two exits of Volzhskaya metro station are located at the park's territory.

See also 
 Lyublino
 Tesktilshchiki

References

External links 
 Энциклопедия «Москва». Люблинский парк культуры и отдыха(недоступная ссылка — «Москва»/Люблинский парк культуры и отдыха/ история)
 Люблинский парк на сайте moscowparks.narod.ru

Parks and gardens in Moscow
Cultural heritage monuments of federal significance in Moscow